Men's Premiership Trophy: IJ Taylor Shield

Men's Minor Premiership Trophy: Lapsley Cup

Women's Premiership Trophy: Rae Reid Cup

Premierships by Club

* defunct club

See also

Lacrosse in Australia

References

Western Australia
Lacrosse Premiers
Lacrosse-related lists